The 1977–78 NBA season was the Lakers' 30th season in the NBA and 18th season in Los Angeles.

Offseason

Draft picks

Roster

Regular season

Season standings

z – clinched division title
y – clinched division title
x – clinched playoff spot

Record vs. opponents

Playoffs

|- align="center" bgcolor="#ffcccc"
| 1
| April 12
| @ Seattle
| L 90–102
| Kareem Abdul-Jabbar (26)
| Kareem Abdul-Jabbar (12)
| Nixon, Scott (6)
| Seattle Center Coliseum14,098
| 0–1
|- align="center" bgcolor="#ccffcc"
| 2
| April 14
| Seattle
| W 105–99
| Kareem Abdul-Jabbar (24)
| Kareem Abdul-Jabbar (18)
| Adrian Dantley (6)
| The Forum15,051
| 1–1
|- align="center" bgcolor="#ffcccc"
| 3
| April 16
| @ Seattle
| L 102–111
| Kareem Abdul-Jabbar (31)
| Kareem Abdul-Jabbar (11)
| Norm Nixon (5)
| Seattle Center Coliseum14,098
| 1–2
|-

Player statistics

Season

Playoffs

Awards and records
 Kareem Abdul-Jabbar, All-NBA Second Team
 Kareem Abdul-Jabbar, NBA All-Defensive Second Team
 Norm Nixon, NBA All-Rookie Team 1st Team

References

Los Angeles Lakers seasons
Los Angeles Lakers
Los Angle
Los Angle